Mullingar railway station serves the town of Mullingar in County Westmeath, Ireland; it is situated  from Dublin, and  from .
Mullingar station is served by national rail company Iarnród Éireann's Dublin to Longford Commuter service and Dublin to Sligo InterCity service.

History

The station opened on 2 October 1848. The Midland Great Western Railway line to Mullingar from Dublin opened in stages from 1846 to 1848, arriving in Mullingar on 2 October 1848. This was to a temporary station, adjacent to the greyhound stadium. The original main line ran from Dublin (Broadstone) to Galway via Mullingar and Athlone, the Mullingar to Galway section opening in August 1851. The present station opened with the branch line to Longford on 14 December 1855.

There were two secondary stations in Mullingar. Canal Crossing cattle bank was on the Sligo Line. On the Athlone Line, Newbrook racecourse had its own station. This was unique in that it was a two platformed station with both platforms on the Down Line.

Mullingar to Athlone Line
There was a railway line to Athlone but it is now disused. It was part of the Midland Great Western Railway Dublin to Galway inter-city rail service.
In 2006, calls were made for the line to Athlone (via Moate) to be reopened to facilitate more services between Galway and Dublin. However, this plan was dropped in favour of creating a new cycling route.

Today Dublin to Galway intercity services go from Dublin Heuston via Portarlington to Athlone line.

RPSI base
The Railway Preservation Society of Ireland (RPSI) has a secondary base in the town. A turntable remains here used by steam locomotives a couple of times a year.

See also
 List of railway stations in Ireland

References

Notes

Footnotes

Sources

External links

Irish Rail Mullingar Station Website

Buildings and structures in Mullingar
Iarnród Éireann stations in County Westmeath
Railway stations in County Westmeath
Railway stations opened in 1848
Railway stations in the Republic of Ireland opened in 1848